Steven Archibald (born 27 September 1956) is a Scottish former professional footballer and manager. He played prominently as a forward for Aberdeen, winning the Scottish league in 1980, Tottenham Hotspur, winning two FA Cups and a UEFA Cup, and Barcelona, winning the Spanish league in 1985. He also played for several other clubs in Scotland, England, Spain and Ireland.

Archibald played 27 times for Scotland, earning selection for their 1982 and 1986 World Cup squads, and was inducted into the Scottish Football Hall of Fame in 2009. He later managed East Fife and Airdrieonians.

Club career
Archibald was born in Glasgow and raised nearby in Rutherglen. He was playing for local teams such as Croftfoot United and Fernhill Athletic while completing his training as a car mechanic when he was spotted by Scottish First Division club Clyde in 1974. He first came to prominence playing in midfield for Clyde, but after manager Billy McNeill paid £20,000 to bring him to top-division side Aberdeen in January 1978 he was converted to striker, forging a prolific partnership with Joe Harper.

After winning the Scottish Premier Division title in 1980, he moved to London club Tottenham Hotspur for £800,000, where he finished the top scorer in the First Division and won the FA Cup in his first season there. He won a second FA Cup in 1982 and then the UEFA Cup in 1984, where he scored his penalty in the final as Spurs overcame Anderlecht in a shootout. He also scored for Spurs in their defeat by Liverpool in the 1982 Football League Cup Final. Archibald scored 77 goals in 189 appearances for Spurs between 1980 and 1984, forming successful striking partnerships with Garth Crooks and Mark Falco.

In 1984, he joined Barcelona for £1,150,000, where in his first season he helped them win the La Liga title for the first time in 11 years. He then helped Barça reach the European Cup final in 1986, only to lose on penalty kicks to Steaua Bucharest. He was a popular figure at the Camp Nou until restrictions on fielding foreign players led to him being excluded from the squad in favour of Gary Lineker and Mark Hughes. He was loaned out to Blackburn Rovers for a spell before to returning to Scotland in 1988 to sign for Hibernian.

Archibald scored 16 goals in his first season at Hibernian, including the winning goal in November 1988 in a 2–1 win away against Hearts, Hibs' first away win against their city rivals in over 10 years. He left Hibs in 1990 after falling out with manager Alex Miller, and had a brief return to Spain with Espanyol (then in the Second Division). He then joined St Mirren and was instrumental in bringing former Barcelona teammate Víctor Muñoz to the club.

Archibald's later career saw him make a handful of appearances at a number of clubs in Scotland, England and Ireland, including a nostalgic return to Clyde.

International career
Archibald was a member of the Scotland national team at the 1982 and 1986 World Cups.

On 15 November 2009, he was inducted into the Scottish Football Hall of Fame.

Management and the Airdrie experiment

Archibald's time at East Fife saw the club gain promotion to the First Division, and was also notable for the acquisition of Trinidad and Tobago internationalists Arnold Dwarika and Craig Demmin. He was sacked in 1996 and retired to his home in Spain for the next few years, working on a number of business interests, including as a football agent.

In 2000 Archibald re-emerged in Scottish football when he mounted a bid to buy financially troubled First Division club Airdrieonians. Archibald was allowed to take over the running of the club after being awarded preferred bidder status by the administrators. He installed himself as manager and, using his contacts in Europe, introduced a contingent of Spaniards and other foreign players to the squad, winning the 2000–01 Scottish Challenge Cup.

Although Airdrie supporters were impressed by Archibald and the skills of the imports, he ultimately failed to conclude the purchase of the club, leading to the departure of himself and the foreign players in March 2001, and causing them to narrowly miss out on relegation to the Second Division. They had also been expelled from the Scottish Cup for failing to fulfil a fixture. Airdrieonians went out of business on 1 May 2002, and a new club called Airdrie United was formed and took Clydebank's place in the Scottish Football League.

Music career
Archibald appeared twice in the same episode of Top of the Pops in 1982, firstly singing "We Have a Dream" with the Scotland World Cup squad starring B. A. Robertson and then alongside his Tottenham Hotspur teammates and Chas & Dave singing "Tottenham, Tottenham".

Honours

Player
Aberdeen
Scottish Premier Division: 1979–80

Tottenham Hotspur
FA Cup: 1980–81, 1981–82
FA Charity Shield: 1981 (shared)
UEFA Cup: 1983–84

Barcelona
La Liga: 1984–85
Copa de la Liga: 1986

Manager
Airdrieonians
Scottish Challenge Cup: 2000–01

Individual
Inducted to Scottish Football Hall of Fame: 2009
Football League First Division top goalscorer: 1980–81

Career statistics

International

Scores and results list Scotland's goal tally first, score column indicates score after each Archibald goal.

References

External links
Steve Archibald — Spurs club profile at Sporting Heroes
Steve Archibald — International profile at Sporting Heroes
Steven Archibald — Club profile at BDFutbol

Scottish Football Hall of Fame profile

1956 births
1982 FIFA World Cup players
1986 FIFA World Cup players
Aberdeen F.C. players
Airdrieonians F.C. (1878) managers
Blackburn Rovers F.C. players
Clyde F.C. players
East Fife F.C. managers
East Fife F.C. players
FC Barcelona players
FC Barcelona Atlètic players
League of Ireland players
First Division/Premier League top scorers
Fulham F.C. players
Hibernian F.C. players
Home Farm F.C. players
La Liga players
Living people
Segunda División players
Footballers from Glasgow
Sportspeople from Rutherglen
RCD Espanyol footballers
Scotland international footballers
Scottish expatriate footballers
Scottish expatriate sportspeople in Spain
Chairmen and investors of football clubs in Scotland
Scottish Football League players
Scottish football managers
Scottish footballers
St Mirren F.C. players
English Football League players
Tottenham Hotspur F.C. players
Scottish Football Hall of Fame inductees
Scottish Football League managers
Scotland under-21 international footballers
East Stirlingshire F.C. players
Reading F.C. players
Association football forwards
UEFA Cup winning players
Expatriate association footballers in the Republic of Ireland
Scottish expatriate sportspeople in Ireland
FA Cup Final players
Footballers from South Lanarkshire